Diane Renay (born July 13, 1945), born Renee Diane Kushner, is an American pop singer, best known for her 1964 hit song, "Navy Blue".

Early life

Renay was born to a Jewish family in South Philadelphia, Pennsylvania. She started singing at an early age and took voice lessons from Artie Singer, a voice teacher who also managed Danny and the Juniors (of "At the Hop" fame). Singer encouraged Renay to pursue a recording career. Renay attended Northeast High School (Philadelphia, Pennsylvania).

Career
Record producer/songwriter Pete DeAngelis was a frequent customer at the Kushners' family jewelry store, and Renay's parents arranged for her to audition for him. DeAngelis, impressed with her talents, got Renay signed to the Atco Records label. Under the new stage name Diane Renay, she released her first single, "Little White Lies", in 1962, but it failed to chart nationally, as did the follow-up, "A Dime a Dozen", and Atco dropped her from the label.

However, Bob Crewe, who had written and produced material for Renay's second recording session, then signed her to a new recording contract whereby he would write and produce records for her. Under Crewe's guidance and signed to the 20th Century label, Renay, then 17 years old, released her biggest hit, "Navy Blue", in late 1963. The song told the story of a girl, lonely for her steady boyfriend away from home in the U.S. Navy and anxious to see him again. "Navy Blue", composed by Crewe with Bud Rehak and Eddie Rambeau, became a national smash, reaching No. 6 on the Hot 100 on 14–21 March 1964, and soaring to No. 1 on the Adult Contemporary singles chart.  The song was followed by Renay's debut album, also titled Navy Blue.

Renay's only other single release to crack the national Billboard chart was "Kiss Me Sailor", reaching number 29 later in 1964. Subsequent singles, including "Growin' Up Too Fast", "Watch Out Sally", "It's In Your Hands", and "Happy Birthday Broken Heart", were hits in certain local markets such as Salt Lake City, Las Vegas and Miami, but failed to break nationally. She did not record again until the early 1980s.

Renay remains active as a performer today and in 2001 released Diane Renay Sings Some Things Old and Some Things New, a double-CD compilation album of her work (including many previously unreleased tracks) from the 1960s through the 1990s.

Album

Singles

See also
List of artists who reached number one on the U.S. Adult Contemporary chart

Bibliography
 Larkin, Colin. The Encyclopedia of Popular Music, 3rd edition, Macmillan, 1998.
 Ruppli, Michel; Novitsky, Ed. The Mercury Labels. A Discography, Vol. V., record and artist indexes, Greenwood Press, 1993.
 Whitburn, Joel. The Billboard Book of Top 40 Hits, 5th edition, Watson-Guptill Publications, 1992.

References

External links

1945 births
American women pop singers
Living people
Musicians from Philadelphia
20th-century American Jews
Jewish singers
MGM Records artists
21st-century American Jews
20th-century American women
21st-century American women